Gudiberg is a mountain of Bavaria, in Garmisch-Partenkirchen, Germany. It lies south of the centre of Partenkirchen and east of the Partnach river.

Alpine skiing
It hosted the slalom part of the alpine skiing combined event for the 1936 Winter Olympics in neighboring Garmisch-Partenkirchen. 

The slalom slope at Gudiberg was improved in preparation for the World Championships in 2011, and has hosted World Cup slalom events.

Olympics

World Championships

World Cup

Ski jumping
The adjacent ski jumping hill Große Olympiaschanze is a regular stop on the World Cup tour, part of the Four Hills Tournament since 1953.

References

1936 Winter Olympics official report. pp. 289–303. 

Venues of the 1936 Winter Olympics
Olympic alpine skiing venues
Mountains of Bavaria
Garmisch-Partenkirchen